"All I Ask For Anymore" is a song written by Casey Beathard and Tim James, and recorded by American country music singer Trace Adkins.  It was released in May 2009 as the third and final single from his album X.  The song overlapped with the chart run of Blake Shelton's "Hillbilly Bone", on which Adkins is also credited.

Content
The song is a mid-tempo in which the narrator tells of how he used to pray to God and ask for material items, but now wishes only for his family's safety.

Critical reception
Thom Jurek of Allmusic said that the song" "arrives with strings, an acoustic guitar, and a pedal steel whispering in that big gritty baritone of Adkins. It's a ballad drenched in personal truth, and gratitude that is profound." Adkins' performance earned him his second consecutive nomination for Best Male Country Vocal Performance at the 52nd Annual Grammy Awards.

Chart performance
On the week ending December 12, 2009, "All I Ask For Anymore" debuted on the Billboard Hot 100 at number 99. It peaked at number 95. In September 2009, it peaked at number 14 on the country chart, as did his previous single, "Marry For Money."

References

2009 singles
Country ballads
2000s ballads
Trace Adkins songs
Songs written by Casey Beathard
Songs written by Tim James (country music songwriter)
Song recordings produced by Frank Rogers (record producer)
Capitol Records Nashville singles
Music videos directed by Deaton-Flanigen Productions
2008 songs